During the 2008 Passover season, kosher-for-Passover margarine in the United States was short in supply due to several issues, leading to a scramble among kosher consumers to obtain the staple since it features prominently in many Passover recipes.

Causes
There were several causes of the margarine shortage.

One was the shortage of cottonseed oil, the main ingredient in the product. Cottonseed oil is used in lieu of corn or soybean oil, the traditional bases for margarine, which are not permitted to Ashkenazi Jews during Passover due to the laws of kitniyot.  Cottonseed oil is a byproduct of cotton; because of the demand for corn-based ethanol, many farmers dropped their cotton crops in favor of more lucrative corn.
Additionally, some of the previous manufacturers of Passover margarine discontinued producing the product after deciding it was not economically feasible. The process of cleansing a margarine plant to make it suitable for producing kosher-for-Passover margarine is complicated, and involves dismantling much of the equipment.

Some of the previous manufacturers felt it was no longer practical to undergo these procedures for a short-term project. Manischewitz and Mother's, two of the largest kosher margarine brands, were only able to provide limited amounts to the marketplace, which were often not in the popular stick form.

Impact

The margarine shortage affected home Passover baking. Dishes which comply with Passover rules are often somewhat lacking in taste, and for this reason margarine is a key ingredient in many Passover recipes.

Often, no substitute is available.

Since the laws of kashrut mandate the separation of milk and meat, margarine is an important butter substitute in recipes that are served with meat meals. Some of the recipes that require large amounts of margarine include Passover desserts, such as cookies.

Many stores rationed the sales of margarine to customers by limiting the number of cases of margarine that could be purchased, and some stores required a minimum number of other items to be purchased.

Haolam, a large manufacturer of kosher cheeses, was able to produce margarine for Passover to meet some of the demands.

Other scarce items
In addition to margarine, matzo was also in short supply for the 2008 Passover season, as were the Tam Tam matzo crackers manufactured by Manischewitz.
Possible reasons for the matzo shortage included business decisions by the Trader Joe's and Costco chains not to stock matzo for 2008, and manufacturing problems at Manischewitz that forced the company to withhold Tam Tams for the year, and to produce less matzo and none of the more strictly made shmurah matzo preferred by many traditional Jews.

References

Margarine
Jewish-American history
2008 in the United States
Margarine
Scarcity